Put On a Happy Face is a 1966 live album by the Oscar Peterson Trio, recorded in sessions in 1961 at the London House jazz club in  Chicago.

Three other Oscar Peterson Trio albums were also released featuring music from the London House concerts: The Trio, The Sound of the Trio, and Something Warm. The complete  sessions were released on CD in 1996 as The London House Sessions.

Track listing
Side One
"Put On a Happy Face" (Lee Adams, Charles Strouse)
"Old Folks" (Dedette Lee Hill, Willard Robison)
"Woody 'n' You" (Dizzy Gillespie)
"Yesterdays" (Otto Harbach, Jerome Kern)

Side Two
  "Diablo" (Oscar Peterson)
"Soon" (George Gershwin, Ira Gershwin)
"The Lonesome One" (Peterson)

Personnel
Oscar Peterson – piano
Ray Brown – double bass
Ed Thigpen – drums

References

1966 live albums
Oscar Peterson live albums
Albums recorded at The London House, Chicago
Verve Records live albums
Albums produced by Norman Granz